Vanessa Curry (born  in Fremont, California) is an American model, dancer and singer. Curry was a Laker girl in the 2007–08 season. She was a member of the third and fourth line-up of The Pussycat Dolls (2010–12) and graduated from Moreau Catholic High School in Hayward, California.

Apart from performing as a vocalist, dancer and rapper for the Dolls, Curry recorded the song, "Watch Me" directed by James McCloud for FROCK Los Angeles LLC. On January 17, 2012 a music video for "Watch Me" was posted on YouTube.com. On August 14 of the same year the band, Nomads published in their YouTube channel the song "Addicted to Love" featuring Vanessa Curry with Leighton Meester and Wilmer Valderrama who was also the director with Andrew Sandler.

Curry appeared with The Pussycat Dolls' fourth line-up debuting on February 5, 2012, during the Super Bowl, as part of GoDaddy’s annual TV commercial, appearing with Danica Patrick.

Curry was on Dancing with the Stars as a dancer for Pitbull.

Personal life 
Curry's mother is Oneyda Curry who was born in Nicaragua. Vanessa Curry has one sister, Nicole.

Vanessa currently resides in Los Angeles County, California.

References

Sources

External links 
 VanessaCurry on Twitter
 Vanessa.curry2 – The official personal Facebook page.
 Curry's FanPage on Facebook

Living people
1990s births
People from Fremont, California
Female models from California
American female dancers
American dance musicians
American women pop singers
National Basketball Association cheerleaders
American cheerleaders
21st-century American women singers
21st-century American singers